Elteber ( or (h)elitbär; Chinese 頡利發 xié-lì-fā < EMCh: *γεt-liH-puat) was the client king of an autonomous but tributary tribe or polity in the hierarchy of the Turkic khaganates including Khazar Khaganate.

In the case of the Khazar Khaganate, the rulers of such vassal peoples as the Volga Bulgars (only until 969, after that they were independent and created a powerful state), Burtas and North Caucasian Huns were titled elteber or some variant such as Ilutwer, Ilutver (North Caucasian Huns), Yiltawar or İltäbär (Volga Bulgaria) (until 969). An Elteber (Almış) is known to have met the famous Muslim traveller Ibn Fadlan and requested assistance from the Abbasids of Baghdad.

The earliest extant mention of the term is for a ruler of the North Caucasian Huns in the 680s, referred to in Christian sources from Caucasian Albania as Alp Ilutuer. The title was also mentioned in Letter to Kültegin in 732. It was used by rulers of pre-Islamic Volga Bulgaria during the period of their vassalage to the Khazars.

Rásonyi (1942:92), apud Golden (1980:149), glossed an "il teber" as "one who steps on the il at the head of conquered tribes"; with il descending from Proto-Turkic *ēl "realm" (Clauson, 1972:121; Sevortijan, 1974:339) whereas täbär from Turkic root *täp- "to kick with foot" (or *tep- / *dēp- "to stamp, tramp"). However, Erdal (2007:81-82) objects to Rásonyi's proposal: Erdal points out that "the Orkhon Turkic aorist of täp- would be täpär" and instead suggests a non-Turkic origin for the title. Róna-Tas (2016:72–73) proposes an Iranian etymology; he compares the Turkic title (H)elteber to Manichean Bactrian l’dβr, Written Sogdian δātβar, Sogdian ryttpyr / dyttpyr  (*litbir), etc. from Middle Iranian *lātbär < Old Iranian *dāta-bara "who brings the law", ultimately from Proto-Indo-European roots *dʰēH "to put, place" & bʰer- "to bring", respectively.

See also
Volga Bulgaria
Eastern Europe
Rutbils of Zabulistan

References

Kevin Alan Brook. The Jews of Khazaria. 3rd ed. Rowman & Littlefield Publishers, 2018.
Gerard Clauson. “él:”, in An Etymological Dictionary of Pre-Thirteenth-Century Turkish, Oxford: Clarendon Press, 1972.
Douglas M. Dunlop. The History of the Jewish Khazars, Princeton, N.J.: Princeton University Press, 1954.
Marcel Erdal, "The Khazar Language" in The World of the Khazars. Brill, 2007. pp. 75-108.
Peter B. Golden. Khazar Studies: An Historico-Philological Inquiry into the Origins of the Khazars. Budapest: Akadémiai Kiadó, 1980.
Norman Golb and Omeljan Pritsak, Khazarian Hebrew Documents of the Tenth Century. Ithaca: Cornell University Press, 1982.
András Róna-Tas, "Bayan and Asparuχ. Nine Notes on Turks and Iranians in East Europe", in Éva Á. Csató et al.(ed.), Turks and Iranians. Interactions in Language and History. The Gunnar Jarring Memorial Program at the Swedish Collegium for Advanced Study. (Turcologica, Vol. 105), Harrassowitz, Wiesbaden 2016, ISBN 978-3-447-10537-8, pp. 65-78.
Ervand Sevortjan. Etymological Dictionary of Turkic Languages (in Russian), volume 1, Moscow: Nauka, 1974.
"*tep- / *dēp-" in Sergei Starostin, Vladimir Dybo, Oleg Mudrak (2003), Etymological Dictionary of the Altaic Languages, Leiden: Brill Academic Publishers.

Heads of state
Khazar titles
Noble titles
Volga Bulgaria
Titles of the Göktürks